The 1999 NRL Grand Final was the conclusive and premiership-deciding game of the 1999 NRL season. It was contested by the competition's two newest clubs: the Melbourne Storm, competing in only its second year (having finished the regular season in 3rd place); and the St. George Illawarra Dragons, in their first year as a joint-venture club (having finished the regular season in 6th place), after both sides eliminated the rest of the top eight during the finals.

A new rugby league world record crowd of 107,999 was at Stadium Australia for the game. The attendance, which saw 67,142 more people attend than had done so for the 1998 NRL Grand Final at the Sydney Football Stadium, broke the record attendance for a Grand Final, eclipsing the previous record of 78,065 set in 1965 when St. George defeated South Sydney 12-8 at the Sydney Cricket Ground. It was the last time that the Clive Churchill Medal was presented in a case before it was changed the following season where it is presented separately with a ribbon being worn around the neck.

Pre-match entertainment featured Hugh Jackman's rendition of the Australian national anthem.

Background

The 1999 NRL season was the 92nd season of professional rugby league football in Australia, and the second to be run by the National Rugby League. With the exclusion of the Adelaide Rams and Gold Coast Chargers, and the merger of the St. George Dragons and Illawarra Steelers, seventeen teams competed for the NRL Premiership during the 1999 season, which culminated in the first grand final to be played at Stadium Australia.

Melbourne Storm

The 1999 Melbourne Storm season was the second in the club's history. Coached by Chris Anderson and captained by Glenn Lazarus, they competed in the NRL's 1999 Telstra Premiership, finishing the regular season in 3rd (out of 17).

St. George Illawarra Dragons

The 1999 St. George Illawarra Dragons season was the first in the newly formed joint-venture club's history. Coached by David Waite and Andrew Farrar, and captained by Paul McGregor, they competed in the NRL's 1999 Telstra Premiership, finishing the regular season in 6th place (out of 17).

Teams

Match details
The Dragons were up 14–0 at half time, with a converted try and penalty goal to Craig Fitzgibbon, and a converted try to Nathan Blacklock. However, an Anthony Mundine knock-on over the try line early in the second half proved to be a major turning point in the match, with Melbourne running in tries through Tony Martin and Ben Roarty and winger Craig Smith kicking two penalty goals. An unconverted try to Dragons captain Paul McGregor couldn't stem Melbourne's momentum, with Craig Smith kicking the Storm to within four points of the Dragons at 18–14.

In the 77th minute the Storm forced the Dragons to a goal line dropout. Melbourne's halfback Brett Kimmorley then bombed to Craig Smith's wing. Dragons  Jamie Ainscough, anticipating a Melbourne try, caught Smith in a head-high tackle over the try-line, resulting in Smith being knocked unconscious and, in the process of falling to the ground, Smith knocking on. Referee Bill Harrigan requested video referee Chris Ward adjudicate on the decision. The Melbourne Storm were granted a penalty try, drawing them level with the Dragons. Being a penalty try, the subsequent conversion was taken from directly in front of the posts. Matt Geyer was successful in the conversion and the Storm, for the first time in the match, pulled ahead of the Dragons and took out their first grand final 20-18.

The Storm thus became the quickest expansion team to win a premiership, eclipsing the Canterbury side who won the 1938 premiership in just their fourth season. It was the last game of champion prop and captain Glenn Lazarus, who retired after a remarkable fifth grand final victory (having won premierships with the Canberra Raiders in 1989 and 1990 and with the Brisbane Broncos in 1992 and 1993).

For traditional St George fans the loss was hard to take. The Dragons were unsuccessful in their four previous visits to the grand final (1985, 1992, 1993 and 1996) and had not won a premiership since 1979. It would not be until 2010 that they would return to another Grand Final, in which it would win its first premiership as a merged entity.

The grand final attracted a television viewership of over 600,000 in Melbourne, a traditional Australian Rules football stronghold.

Scoreboard

See also
1999 Melbourne Storm season
2000 World Club Challenge

References

External links
 1999 NRL Grand Final at NRL.com
 Match replay at NRL.com

NRL Grand Finals
Grand final
Melbourne Storm matches
St. George Illawarra Dragons matches